Andrew Sebastian Williams (born 18 February 1970) is the drummer and vocalist of Doves. He is the son of noted modernist architect Desmond Williams and the twin brother of bandmate Jez. Andy and Jez were born in Manchester, England and have a brother Dominic and sister Sarah. 

Before forming Doves, the band's three members were a dance-club music trio called Sub Sub.

While Doves were on a hiatus between 2010 and 2020, Andy and Jez Williams formed a side project called Black Rivers, releasing a self-titled album in February 2015.

Andy sings occasional backing vocals and also lead vocals on some songs; "Melody Calls" and the verses of "Here It Comes" from Lost Souls, "M62 Song" from The Last Broadcast, the B-sides "Hit the Ground Running", "45" (verses) & "At The Tower" (chorus), "Shadows of Salford" from Some Cities and the verses of "Blue Water" from the special edition of The Places Between: The Best of Doves.

Andy plays the harmonica on "Here It Comes". He also plays the melodica during live acoustic versions of "Snowden" (see: "Snowden" live at Waterloo Records, Texas).

References

English rock drummers
Doves (band) members
1970 births
Living people
Musicians from Manchester
21st-century drummers